Batu, formerly Zway or Ziway, is a town and woreda on the road connecting Addis Ababa to Nairobi in the East Shewa Zone of Oromia Region, Ethiopia.

Economy
Located on the shore of Hora Dambal, the economy of the town is based on fishing and horticulture. Batu is also home to a prison and a caustic soda factory. The Dutch company Sher operates what in 2019 has been called "the world's largest rose farm, employing 1,500 workers."

Demographics
The 2007 national census reported a total population for Batu of 43,660, of whom 22,956 were men and 20,704 were women. The majority of the inhabitants said they practised Ethiopian Orthodox Christianity, with 51.04% of the population reporting they observed this belief, while 24.69% of the population were Muslim, 0.42% practiced traditional beliefs, and 22.07% of the population were Protestant. The 1994 national census reported this town had a total population of 20,056 of whom 10,323 were males and 9,733 were females.

References

External links

Populated places in the Oromia Region
Ethiopia
Cities and towns in Ethiopia